Henri Meslot (4 September 1884 – 1 March 1973) was a French athlete who competed at the 1908 Summer Olympics in London. He was born in Paris and died in Toulon.

In the 100 metres event, Meslot took third place in his first round heat and did not advance to the semifinals. He finished second in his three-man heat of the 200 metres competition with a time of 23.2 seconds, not advancing in that event either. In the 400 metre hurdles event he was also eliminated in the first round.

References

Sources

External links 
 
 

1884 births
1973 deaths
French male sprinters
Olympic athletes of France
Athletes (track and field) at the 1908 Summer Olympics